Husein Mehmedov (25 January 1924 – 9 March 2014) was a Bulgarian wrestler of Turkish descent who competed in the 1956 Summer Olympics.

Husein Mekhmedov was of the Turkish minority in Bulgaria and as wrestling is Turkey’s national sport, he was introduced to wrestling at a young age. Mehmedov competed in heavyweight his entire career and was equally strong at both styles of wrestling. He was selected to the Bulgarian national team in 1950 after his military service with the Bulgarian Army. Mehmedov had a brief, but quite successful international career. He first competed internationally at the 1955 World Student Games, winning gold in Greco-Roman heavyweight. In 1956, he won bronzes in both Greco-Roman and freestyle at the World Cup and established himself as one of the medal contenders at both heavyweight styles at the 1956 Olympics. At Melbourne, Mekhmedov won silver in freestyle, but a few days later had to withdraw from the Greco-Roman event after two bouts due to injury. In 1957, he won gold in freestyle and silver in Greco-Roman heavyweight at the World Student Games and later won bronze at the 1957 World Freestyle Wrestling Championships. Those World Championships were Mehmedov’s last international appearance as he finished his competitive career in 1959. He then worked as a wrestling coach in Bulgaria until 1989 when he emigrated to Turkey. He settled in Istanbul, where he died in March 2014 at the age of 90.
Hussein Mehmedov was a beloved father to Resmiye Şengüler. Loving and proud grandpa to Mehnur Çakır, Hatice Şengüler, Hüseyin Çakır, And Ata Nuh.

References

External links
 

1924 births
2014 deaths
Bulgarian people of Turkish descent
Olympic wrestlers of Bulgaria
Wrestlers at the 1956 Summer Olympics
Bulgarian male sport wrestlers
Olympic silver medalists for Bulgaria
Olympic medalists in wrestling
People from Razgrad Province
Medalists at the 1956 Summer Olympics
Bulgarian Turks in Turkey
World Wrestling Championships medalists
Bulgarian military personnel